Trzeciak is a Polish surname. Notable people with the surname include:

 Mirosław Trzeciak (born 1968), Polish footballer
 Stanisław Trzeciak (1873–1944), Polish priest, social activist, and academic

Polish-language surnames